Dover to Kingsdown Cliffs is a  biological and geological Site of Special Scientific Interest which runs along the Kent coast between Dover and Kingsdown. It is a Geological Conservation Review site and a Special Area of Conservation, and part of it is The White Cliffs of Dover, owned by the National Trust. 

The cliffs have fossiliferous rocks dating to the Cretaceous between 99 and 86 million years ago, and they are historically important as many geological principles were tested there. The cliffs have many breeding sea birds, and there are diverse algae on the foreshore.

A public footpath runs through the site.

References

Sites of Special Scientific Interest in Kent
Geological Conservation Review sites
Special Areas of Conservation in England
Cliffs of England
Kent coast